Hamari Sister Didi  is an Indian drama series broadcast on Sony Pal'

Story

The show revolves around Amrita also known as Sister Didi, who is a head nurse in Muskaan Hospital at Patiala. The hospital was her husband Dr. Avinash's dream – he believed that a doctor’s duty does not end by just giving the patient medicines; care and love come first. And that's the way Amrita continued treatment at the hospital even after his untimely death. Dr. Karan is the new attendant in the hospital. The moment he enters, he is appalled at the functioning of the hospital. He tries to make changes, which obviously do not go down well with Amrita.

Cast

 Pariva Pranati as Amrita Kapoor aka Sister Didi – Head nurse at Muskaan Hospital; Avinash's widow; Karan's wife; Khushi and Suraj's mother 
 Bhanu Uday as Dr. Karan Oberoi – Chief doctor at Muskaan Hospital; Amrita's husband
 Hiten Tejwani as Dr. Avinash "Avi" Kapoor – Founder and former chief doctor at Muskaan Hospital; Kamini's son; Amrita's first husband; Khushi and Suraj's father (Dead)
 Avneet Kaur as Khushi Kapoor – Amrita and Avinash's daughter; Suraj's sister
 Uzair Basar as Suraj Kapoor – Amrita and Avinash's son; Khushi's brother
 Alka Kaushal / Sadhana Singh as Kamini Kapoor – Avinash's mother; Khushi and Suraj's grandmother
 Rishika Mihani as Dimple Khanna 
 Shivangi Verma as Meher – Nurse at Muskaan Hospital
 Ishaan Singh Manhas as Veer Dev
 Khushboo Purohit as Mallika – Nurse at Muskaan Hospital

References

External links
 Hamari Sister Didi official video

2014 Indian television series debuts
Hindi-language television shows
Indian drama television series
2015 Indian television series endings
Sony Pal original programming
Television shows set in Punjab, India
Indian medical television series